Rich Skrosky (born October 26, 1964) is an American college football coach and former player who is currently a Senior Analyst at Duke University. He was hired as head football coach at Elon University for the 2014 season. Skrosky served as an assistant coach at Elon under Pete Lembo from 2006 to 2010. Lembo's tenure brought new success to Elon's football program, which made its first FCS playoff appearance in 2009. Lembo was hired as head coach at Ball State University after the 2010 season. Skrosky joined Lembo's staff as offensive coordinator.

Early career
Born in Passaic, New Jersey and raised in Lodi, Skrosky graduated from Lodi High School, where he later served as an assistant head coach of the school's football team.  He then worked as a graduate assistant for Rutgers under head coach Dick Anderson.

In 1990, Skrosky was hired as offensive coordinator at Ramapo College, an NCAA Division III school competing in the New Jersey Athletic Conference.  In 1992, Skrosky served one season as head football coach at Ramapo. The team finished with a 1–8 record.

Skrosky then served as offensive coordinator and offensive line coach at Monmouth from 1993-2000 and at Columbia from 2001-2005.  
From 2009 to 2010 Skrosky was an offensive coordinator of the Elon Phoenix's football division and led its Southern Conference to the sixth place in the 2009 NCAA Division I FCS football season with 291.50 passing-yards-per-game. During the 2010 NCAA Division I FCS football season he led the Phoenix to become the eighth ranked team in the nation with 435.18 yards-per-game, averaging at the 31.9 points-per-game and holding 322.36 yards-per-outing cap.

From 2011 to 2013 Skrosky was an offensive coordinator for the Ball State University's Ball State Cardinals.

In the third week of the 2016 season, the Phoenix upset 8th-ranked William and Mary 27–10, their first win against a Top 10 opponent since 2007.

In 2017 Skrosky had joined Butch Davis's FIU Panthers as an offensive coordinator. He was fired after four seasons on December 23, 2020. 

In January of 2022 Skrosky joined Mike Elko's Duke Blue Devils as a Senior Analyst.

Head coaching record

References

External links
 FIU profile

1964 births
Living people
American football defensive backs
Ball State Cardinals football coaches
Columbia Lions football coaches
Elon Phoenix football coaches
FIU Panthers football coaches
Lodi High School (New Jersey) alumni
Monmouth Hawks football coaches
Players of American football from New Jersey
Ramapo Roadrunners football coaches
Ramapo Roadrunners football players
Rutgers Scarlet Knights football coaches
High school football coaches in New Jersey
People from Lodi, New Jersey
Sportspeople from Bergen County, New Jersey
Sportspeople from Passaic, New Jersey